Benoît Régent (19 August 1953 – 22 October 1994) was a French actor.

He was born in Nantes. He died at the age of 41 of a ruptured aneurysm in Zürich, Switzerland.

Partial filmography

Femme intégrale (1980) - Jacques
La Peau de chagrin (1980, TV Movie) - Bixiou
Peer Gynt (1981, TV Movie) - Un jeune homme
 (1982)  - L'employé de la FNAC
 (1983) - Makovski
Stella (1983) - Chef F.F.I
La Java des ombres (1983) - Le dealer
Dangerous Moves (1984) - Barabal
Mon ami Washington (1984) - Jacques Trentin
Train d'enfer (1984) - Jouffroy
L'Été prochain (1985) - Le médecin
Rouge-gorge (1985) - Philippe Page
Subway (1985) - Le Vendeur
Spéciale police (1985) - Livio
Adieu la vie (1986, TV Series) - Malard
 (1986) - Henri
Un homme et une femme, 20 ans déjà (1986) - Un infirmier
Round Midnight (1986) - Psychiatrist
Noir et blanc (1986)
A Flame in My Heart (Une flamme dans mon cœur) (1987) - Pierre
Nouilles (1987, Short) - Un client
L'Île aux oiseaux (1988) - Vincent
Accord parfait (1988) - Le père
La Maison de Jeanne (1988) - Pierre
Savannah (1988) - Le pompiste
La Bande des quatre (1989) - Thomas
A Soldier's Tale (1989) - Father Superior
Bunker Palace Hôtel (1989) - Nikolaï
Dr. M (1990) - Stieglitz
Jean Galmot, aventurier (1990) - Alexandre Stavisky
J'entends plus la guitare (1991) - Gerard
Pierre qui roule (1991, TV Movie) - Pierre
Parking (1992, TV Series) - Le Gardien
Three Colors: Blue (1993) - Olivier
Jeux d'enfants (1993, TV Movie) - Vincent
Grand bonheur (1993) - Bernard
Attendre le navire (1993)
Three Colors: Red (1994) - Olivier
Du fond du coeur (1994) - Benjamin Constant
En mai, fais ce qu'il te plaît (1995) - Jean-Claude
...à la campagne (1995) - Benoît
Noir comme le souvenir (1995) - Dr. David Wahl (final film role)

External links

1953 births
1994 deaths
Actors from Nantes
French male film actors
French male television actors
French male stage actors
20th-century French male actors
Deaths from aneurysm